Wasl Al-Thowaibi is a Saudi Arabian football player who currently plays as a midfielder.

External links
Profile at football.com

Profile at goal.com
2010-2011 slstat.com Profile
2011-2012 slstat.com Profile
2012-2013 slstat.com Profile

1980 births
Living people
Saudi Arabian footballers
Okaz Club players
Al-Shabab FC (Riyadh) players
Al-Faisaly FC players
Al-Shoulla FC players
Ohod Club players
Wej SC players
Saudi Fourth Division players
Saudi First Division League players
Saudi Professional League players
Saudi Second Division players
Association football midfielders